The Midnight Taxi is a 1928 American early part-talkie thriller picture from Warner Bros. directed by  John G. Adolfi and starring Antonio Moreno, Helen Costello, and Myrna Loy. According to the Library of Congress, it has a completed copy of the film and found at British Film Institute's National Film and Television Archive.

Cast
Antonio Moreno as Tony Driscoll
Helene Costello as Nan Parker
Myrna Loy as Gertie Fairfax
William Russell as Joseph Brant
Tommy Dugan as Al Corvini
Bobby Agnew as Jack Madigan
Pat Hartigan as Detective Blake
Jack Santoro as Lefty
William Hauber as Squint
Paul Kreuger as Dutch
Spencer Bell as Rastus

See also
 Myrna Loy filmography

References

External links

The Midnight Taxi at Vitaphone Varieties 

1928 films
Films directed by John G. Adolfi
American silent feature films
Transitional sound films
Warner Bros. films
1928 drama films
American black-and-white films
1920s thriller drama films
American thriller drama films
1920s American films
Silent American drama films
Silent thriller drama films